Battle's sign, also known as mastoid ecchymosis, is an indication of fracture of middle cranial fossa of the skull. These fractures may be associated with underlying brain trauma. Battle's sign consists of bruising over the mastoid process as a result of extravasation of blood along the path of the posterior auricular artery. The sign is named after William Henry Battle.

Battle's sign takes at least one day to appear after the initial traumatic basilar skull fracture, similar to raccoon eyes. It is usually seen after head injuries resulting in injury to mastoid process leading to bruising.

Battle's sign may be confused with a spreading hematoma from a fracture of the mandibular condyle,  which is a less serious injury.

See also
Basilar skull fracture
Raccoon eyes
Black eye

References

Traumatology
Injuries